The United States women's national baseball team is a national team that represents the United States of America in international women's baseball competitions. It is controlled by USA Baseball and is a member of the Pan American Baseball Confederation (COPABE).

Tournament records

Women's World Cup
The United States team has participated in every edition of the Women's World Cup. The United States team has won twice, finished second twice, and finished third twice.

Pan-American Games
The United States team has qualified for the 2015 Pan-American Games tournament in Toronto, Ontario, Canada. This will be the first time a women's baseball tournament has been held as part of the Pan-American Games.

Rosters

2015 Pan American Games 
The United States women's national baseball team announced their roster for the 2015 Pan American Games on May 24, 2015. The final roster as of July 19, 2015 is listed below. 

 Veronica Alvarez (C)
 Ryleigh Buck (P/IF)
 Samantha Cobb (P/OF)
 Alex Fulmer (P)
 Veronica Gajownik (P/IF)
 Brittany Gomez (OF)
 Jade Gortarez (P/IF)

 Tamara Holmes (OF)
 Sarah Hudek (P/OF)
 Anna Kimbrell (P/C)
 Jenna Marston (P/IF)
 Stacy Piagno (P)
 Nicole Rivera (P/IF)
 Cydnee Sanders (P/IF)
 Marti Sementelli (P)
 Michelle Snyder (P/IF)
 Malaika Underwood (IF)
 Kelsie Whitmore (P/OF)

Legend: C = Catcher, IF = Infielder, OF = Outfielder, P = Pitcher

Bibliography

References

External links 
 USA women's national baseball team on USA Baseball

women's national
Women's national baseball teams
National